The Human Fertilisation and Embryology Act 2008 (c 22) is an Act of the Parliament of the United Kingdom. The Act constitutes a major review and update of the Human Fertilisation and Embryology Act 1990.

According to the Department of Health the Act's key provisions are:

The Bill's discussion in Parliament did not permit time to debate whether it should extend abortion rights under the Abortion Act 1967 to also cover Northern Ireland. The 2008 Act does not alter the status quo.

The Act also repealed and replaced the Human Reproductive Cloning Act 2001.

References

Further reading

Human Fertilisation and Embryology Act at the Wellcome Trust

External links
The Human Fertilisation and Embryology Act 2008, as amended from the National Archives.
The Human Fertilisation and Embryology Act 2008, as originally enacted from the National Archives.
Explanatory notes to the Human Fertilisation and Embryology Act 2008.

United Kingdom Acts of Parliament 2008
Cloning
Medical regulation in the United Kingdom
Surrogacy